Father José Joaquin Jimeno (1804–1856) was a Spanish missionary to the Americas.

Father Jimeno is known to have traveled with Father Mariano Payeras to San Jacinto, a distant rancho of Mission San Luis Rey de Francia in September 1821. He also appears in an 1836 sketch of Mission San Gabriel Arcángel. From 1838 to 1844 he held the position of Presidente of the California mission chain and of Vicáreo Foraneo to the bishop.

1804 births
1856 deaths
Californios
People of Alta California
Roman Catholic missionaries in Mexico
Spanish Franciscans
Priests of the Spanish missions in California
Spanish Roman Catholic missionaries
Spanish expatriates in Mexico